Ground Zero is the third studio album by the American deathcore band As Blood Runs Black. It was released on October 27, 2014. It is the band's first album with the vocalist Christopher Bartholomew. The songs "Insomniac", "Vision", "An Oath", and "Eulogy" have clean vocals, a first for the band.

History
Crowdfunding for the album began on June 30, 2013, and ended on September 29, 2013. Due to numerous setbacks (robbery, being dropped from their record label, several lineup changes — including then-vocalist Sonik Garcia) - many fans speculated that the band might not produce their third album. According to the drummer Hector "Lech" De Santiago, on August 11, 2014, the band was splitting up. A week later, on August 18, the band released the first single from the album, titled "Insomniac", and announced a final North America farewell tour to support the album beginning in fall 2014. The band intended to part ways on concluding the tour.

Track listing

Credits
As Blood Runs Black
Christopher Bartholomew – vocals
Dan Sugarman – lead guitar
Greg Kirkpatrick – rhythm guitar
Nick Stewart – bass
Hector "Lech" De Santiago – drums

Additional musicians
Volumes – group vocals
Thy Art Is Murder – group vocals

Production
Zack Ohren – mixing, mastering
Justin Fields – album artwork
Daniel McBride – layout, additional art
Greg Ontiveros – band photo
Christopher Bianchi - management

References

2014 albums
Self-released albums
As Blood Runs Black albums
Crowdfunded albums
Indiegogo projects